The Country Mouse and the City Mouse: A Christmas Tale is an animated TV special produced and directed by Michael Sporn and written by Maxine Fisher, adapted by Tish Rabe. Produced by Michael Sporn Animation, Random House and HBO. It aired on December 8, 1993 as part as the HBO Storybook Musicals series. As the title implies, the story is an adaptation of the Aesop fable, where it was set around Christmastime. The special's two main characters, Emily and Alexander, were voiced respectively by Crystal Gayle and John Lithgow.

In 1994, Random House Children's Media published a children's book titled, The Country Mouse and The City Mouse: Christmas Is Where The Heart Is, which was based on the animated special. The book was written by Maxine Fisher and illustrated by Jerry Smath.

The main characters would later appear in the second iteration of Cinar's animated series, The Country Mouse and the City Mouse Adventures, which also aired on HBO.

Synopsis
At the Johnson's farm in the country, a female mouse named Emily, whose existence is known to the two children named Patty and her little brother, Kevin living there, decides to go into the city to visit her cousin Alexander for Christmas. However, the chef the restaurant Alexander lives in has set a variety of anti-mice precautions, thus scaring the two cousins out of the restaurant. The two mice return to the country house to celebrate Christmas together.

References

External links

Review at The New York Times
Overview at Creighton University

1993 films
1993 television specials
1990s American television specials
1990s animated television specials
Animated films about mice
Works based on Aesop's Fables
HBO network specials
Warner Bros. films
Christmas television specials
Films based on Aesop's Fables